Robert Lis (born 10 December 1973) is a former Polish handball player and current coach of KS Azoty-Puławy.

References 

Polish male handball players
Living people
1973 births
Sportspeople from Warsaw
Polish expatriate sportspeople in France
Polish handball coaches
Expatriate handball players